The seal of the town of Manchester in Connecticut consists of a Mulberry tree with "Town of Manchester Connecticut Seal" engulfing it. There is also the year of incorporation, 1823, fashioned out of a silk thread, all of which is on to a yellow background.

The town seal is an homage to the silk industry that centered on the Cheney Mills near downtown Manchester.

References

Official seals of places in Connecticut
Seal
Silk
Trees